Tarik Bouguetaïb (born 30 April 1981) is a Moroccan long jumper and triple jumper. He was born in Casablanca.

In the long jump he finished thirteenth at the 2006 African Championships. He also competed at the Olympic Games in 2004 and 2008 without reaching the final.

His personal best jump is 8.22 metres, achieved in March 2008 in Meknès.

In the triple jump won the 2006 African Championships, finished sixth at the 2006 World Cup and won the bronze medal at the 2008 African Championships. He also competed at the 2005 World Championships and the 2007 World Championships without reaching the final.

His personal best jump is 17.37 metres, achieved in July 2007 in Khémisset. This is the African record.

References

External links

1981 births
Living people
Sportspeople from Casablanca
Moroccan male triple jumpers
Moroccan male long jumpers
Olympic athletes of Morocco
Athletes (track and field) at the 2004 Summer Olympics
Athletes (track and field) at the 2008 Summer Olympics
World Athletics Championships athletes for Morocco
Mediterranean Games silver medalists for Morocco
Athletes (track and field) at the 2005 Mediterranean Games
Mediterranean Games medalists in athletics
21st-century Moroccan people